Riley Greene (born September 28, 2000) is an American professional baseball outfielder for the Detroit Tigers of Major League Baseball (MLB). He was drafted fifth overall by the Tigers in the 2019 MLB draft. He made his MLB debut in 2022.

Amateur career
Greene attended Paul J. Hagerty High School in Oviedo, Florida, where he played on their baseball team alongside Vaughn Grissom. In 2018, he played for Team USA in the U-18 Pan-American Championships. As a senior in 2019, he hit .422 with eight home runs and 27 runs batted in (RBIs). He committed to play college baseball at the University of Florida.

Professional career
Greene was considered one of the top prospects for the 2019 Major League Baseball draft. He was drafted by the Detroit Tigers with the fifth overall pick. On June 5, the Tigers signed Greene to a contract with a $6.18 million signing bonus.

Greene made his professional debut on June 24, 2019, for the rookie-level Gulf Coast League Tigers. In July, he was promoted to the Connecticut Tigers of the Class A-Short Season New York-Penn League, and in August, he earned a promotion to the West Michigan Whitecaps of the Class A Midwest League. Over 57 games between the three clubs, he slashed .271/.347/.403 with five home runs and 28 RBIs. Greene did not play a minor league game in 2020 due to the cancellation caused by the COVID-19 pandemic.

Greene began the 2021 season with the Erie SeaWolves of the Double-A Northeast. In June, he was selected to represent the Tigers in the All-Star Futures Game alongside Spencer Torkelson. In August, he was promoted to the Toledo Mud Hens of the Triple-A East. Over 124 games between the two clubs, Greene slashed .301/.387/.534 with 24 home runs, 84 RBIs, 16 stolen bases, 25 doubles, and eight triples. He was named the 4th best prospect in baseball in Baseball America annual Top 100 list for 2022.

The Tigers planned to include Greene on their Opening Day roster for the 2022 season, but he broke his right foot and missed the start of the season. On June 18, 2022, the Tigers purchased Greene's contract, adding him to the active roster, and he made his Major League debut that afternoon. In his first at-bat, he hit a single.

On July 2, 2022, Greene hit a walk-off home run off of Joel Payamps of the Kansas City Royals for his first career MLB home run. He became the first Tigers player since Lou Whitaker in 1978 to accomplish this feat.Greene was named the 2022 Detroit Tigers Rookie of the Year by the Detroit Sports Media Association and Tiger of the Year by the Detroit Chapter of the Baseball Writers' Association of America.

References

External links

 

2000 births
Living people
Baseball players from Orlando, Florida
Major League Baseball outfielders
Detroit Tigers players
United States national baseball team players
Gulf Coast Tigers players
Connecticut Tigers players
West Michigan Whitecaps players
Erie SeaWolves players
Toledo Mud Hens players
Lakeland Flying Tigers players